Alden Partridge Colvocoresses (September 23, 1918 – March 27, 2007) helped to develop the Space-oblique Mercator projection with John P. Snyder and John Junkins, and developed the first satellite map of the United States in 1974.

Biography

Early life 
Colvocoresses was born in 1918 to George M. Colvocoresses II and Alice Hagen, in Humboldt, Arizona. He is the grandson of George Partridge Colvocoresses and the great-grandson of George Colvocoresses.

Army career 
Colvocoresses served in the U.S. Army in World War II, in the 16th Armored Engineer Battalion of the 1st Armored Division, in North Africa and Europe. He was twice wounded in combat, receiving the Purple Heart. Colvocoresses was also twice awarded the Silver Star for valor: once, for capturing a German tank in Tunisia; and again, for escaping his Italian captors in North Africa.

He became involved with aerial photo mapping for the 1st Army, where he oversaw some of the photo mapping as preparation for the Normandy landings. He also served in the Korean War, and retired after playing a large role in mapping operations during the Vietnam War.

Later life 
Colvocoresses spent the rest of his career working for the U.S. Geological Survey's national mapping division, retiring in 1990. He was a research cartographer on the Landsat satellite program and received two patents for models of remote sensing systems. Alden helped to develop the first satellite map of the United States.

He died on March 27, 2007. He is buried at Arlington National Cemetery.

References

Further reading 
 Hessler, J. (2003). Projecting Time: John Parr Snyder and the Development of the Space Oblique Mercator Projection. Library of Congress.

United States Army colonels
American people of Greek descent
1918 births
2007 deaths
People from Yavapai County, Arizona
United States Army personnel of World War II
Burials at Arlington National Cemetery
Recipients of the Silver Star
American military personnel of the Korean War
Military personnel from Arizona
20th-century American inventors